Cricket is a popular sport in Sri Lanka.  The country has eight grounds that have been used to host international cricket matches, and seven of them have hosted Test matches. However, the Colombo Cricket Club Ground and the Tyronne Fernando Stadium are no longer used for matches at international level, although they are still used for domestic matches and warm-up matches for visiting teams. The Galle International Stadium was destroyed in the 2004 Indian Ocean tsunami, but was rebuilt and hosted international matches again in 2007. The Rangiri Dambulla International Stadium held its maiden One Day International in 2001, but was unable to host another until 2003 due to a legal problem.

The Hambantota and Pallekele cricket grounds were both newly constructed for 2011 Cricket World Cup, which Sri Lanka jointly hosted with India and Bangladesh.  The R. Premadasa Stadium has also hosted world cup matches. The R. Premadasa Stadium was also one of the three grounds in Sri Lanka that hosted matches for the 1996 Cricket World Cup. The other two were the Asgiriya Stadium and the Sinhalese Sports Club Ground.

The R. Premadasa Stadium was the venue for the match in 1997 where Sri Lanka scored a record 952 runs for 6 wickets against India. Sri Lankan cricketer Mahela Jayawardene has scored a total of 2467 Test runs at the Sinhalese Sports Club Ground, the most runs scored by a batsman in one ground. It is also the venue where he scored 374 runs, the highest score by a Sri Lankan batsman. The venue where the most Test wickets have been taken by a single bowler is also the Sinhalese Sports Club Ground, where 166 have been taken by Muttiah Muralitharan. The Asgiriya Stadium ranks second with 117 wickets, and is followed by the Galle International Stadium with 103 wickets. Both these records are also held by Muralitharan. Sanath Jayasuriya has scored 2514 ODI runs at the R. Premadasa Stadium, making it the venue which has the highest ODI runs by a single batsman. The largest non-cricket stadium in Sri Lanka is the 25,000-capacity Sugathadasa Stadium, which is used mostly for association football matches.

Cricket grounds

Key

Notes

See also

 List of Sri Lanka national cricket captains

References

External links
 Grounds in Sri Lanka from Cricinfo

Cricket grounds in Sri Lanka
Sri Lanka
grounds
Cricket grounds